Salimo Sylla (born 25 January 1994) is a French professional footballer who plays as a defender for  club Versailles.

Career 
In January 2022, Sylla returned to France by signing for Versailles in the Championnat National 2.

Honours 
Versailles

 Championnat National 2: 2021–22

References

Living people
1994 births
Association football defenders
French footballers
French expatriate footballers
Ligue 2 players
Championnat National 2 players
Championnat National 3 players
Belgian Pro League players
Super League Greece players
ES Troyes AC players
AJ Auxerre players
Sint-Truidense V.V. players
Xanthi F.C. players
R.E. Virton players
FC Versailles 78 players
Challenger Pro League players
Expatriate footballers in Belgium
Expatriate footballers in Greece
French expatriate sportspeople in Belgium
French expatriate sportspeople in Greece
People from Châlons-en-Champagne
Sportspeople from Marne (department)
Footballers from Grand Est